A stingray is a type of cartilaginous fish.

Stingray or Sting Ray may also refer to:

Arts and entertainment

Film and television 

 Stingray (1964 TV series), a British children's series
 "Stingray" (Stingray episode), the first episode of the above series
 Stingray (1985 TV series), an American drama
 Stingray (film), a 1978 action comedy film directed by Richard Taylor
 Stingray Timmins, a character on the Australian soap opera Neighbours
 Lord Stingray, a fictional character on the American animated TV series Superjail!
 Stingray, the main antagonist from Godfrey Ho's 1993 martial arts film Undefeatable

Music 

 Music Man StingRay, an instrument
 Stingray (album), by rock singer Joe Cocker
 Stingray Music, a Canadian digital television audio service
 "Stingray" (The Tornados song), a 1965 instrumental single
 "Stingray", A song by instrumental rock band The Shadows
 Stingray (band), a South African rock band, active around 1980
 The Sting-rays, a British (Greater London) psychobilly band, active 1980s
 The Stingrays (Bristol band), a British new wave musical group, active 1977-present
 King Stingray, an Australian band, active in 2020s

Other uses in arts and entertainment 

 Stingray (comics), a Marvel Comics character
 Stingray Group, a media and entertainment company
 Stingray (ride), an amusement park attraction
 Autodesk Stingray, a video game engine owned by Autodesk - formerly called Bitsquid

People 

 Sting Ray Robb (born 2001), American auto racing driver

Sports teams 

 Dandenong Stingrays, an Australian rules football team that plays in an under 18s league in Victoria
 Florida Stingrays, a team of the American Indoor Football Association
 Gold Coast Stingrays, an Australian Gridiron football club of the Gridiron Queensland League
 Hull Stingrays, an ice hockey club from Kingston upon Hull, England
 Long Beach Stingrays, a defunct professional women's basketball team of the American Basketball League
 Rhode Island Stingrays, a defunct American soccer team of the USL Premier Development League
 San Diego Stingrays, a defunct semi-professional basketball team that was a member of the International Basketball League
 South Carolina Stingrays, an ECHL professional minor-league hockey team

Vehicles

Cars 

 Chevrolet Corvette (C2), produced between 1963 and 1967
 Chevrolet Corvette (C3), produced between 1968 and 1982
 Chevrolet Corvette (C7), produced between 2014 and 2019
 Chevrolet Corvette (C8), beginning with model year 2020
 Corvette Stingray (concept car), designed in 1957
 Suzuki Wagon R Stingray, variant of the Suzuki Wagon R

Other vehicles 

 Dyke Stingray, a variant of the Dyke Delta home-built aircraft
 MH-68A Stingray, a variant of the AgustaWestland AW109 helicopter, used by the US Coast Guard
 Progressive Aerodyne Stingray, an American flying boat design
 Sting-Ray, a bicycle made by Schwinn Bicycle Company
 Stingray light tank, an armored vehicle
 USS Stingray, two real submarines and two fictional ones
 Boeing MQ-25 Stingray, an aerial refuelling drone in development for the US Navy

Other uses 

 Sting Ray Harbour, original name given to Botany Bay, Australia by James Cook
 Sting Ray torpedo, a naval weapon
 Stingray Nebula, a planetary nebula in the southern constellation Ara
 Stingray phone tracker, a cellular phone surveillance device manufactured by Harris Corporation
 Stingray, a boat-trapping net made by Foster-Miller

See also 

 
 King Stingray, contemporary Aboriginal Australian band